Dumitru Ion Suchianu (September 2, 1895–April 17/18, 1985) was a Romanian essayist, translator, film theorist and political economist.

Born in Iași, his parents were Hanes-Ogias Suchianu, a professor of Armenian origin, and his wife Lelia (née Nanu-Muscel). He attended high school in Bucharest and at the modern language section of the Boarding High School in his native city, from which he graduated in 1914. He then earned a degree in law, literature and philosophy from the University of Iași, followed by a doctorate in political and economic sciences from the University of Paris. He subsequently became associate professor at the law faculty of the University of Bucharest, in the department of social doctrines. He was full professor at the Higher War School and at the Fine Arts Academy, as well as professor of political economy and finance at the State Sciences School. He worked as a magistrate from 1926 to 1948. A member of the film censorship committee from 1929 to 1941, he held courses on cinematography and promoted the discipline through several books (Curs de cinematografie, 1930; Cinematograful, acest necunoscut, 1973; Nestemate cinematografice, 1980). For a decade, he wrote the film column for România Literară.

Suchianu's literary activity began in the Viața Românească circle; together with his brother-in-law and high school and university classmate Mihai Ralea, he co-directed the magazine from 1937 to 1940 and again in 1946. He made his published debut in its pages, with the 1921 study Thomas Hardy. He wrote frequently on a variety of topics, including philosophy, literature, aesthetics, sociology, psychology and cinematography, for Viața Românească, Universul literar și artistic, Lumea, Contemporanul and Astra. His first book was the 1928 collection of literary studies Aspecte literare; another appeared in 1978 as Foste adevăruri viitoare. He wrote three volumes of political economy: Introducere în economia politică (1930), Manual de sociologie (1931) and Despre avuție. He translated Miorița into French, as well as poems by Tudor Arghezi, while translating Michel Georges-Michel, Silvio Micheli, Alberto Moravia and Georges Sadoul into Romanian. A deeply cultured man with a solid knowledge of psychology, political economy, natural science, literature and film, he wrote several books of essays (Puncte de vedere, 1930; Diverse însemnări și amintiri, 1933; Amica mea Europa, 1939). These are marked by erudition and style, subtle observation and deft analogies; they employ ideas and information in an elevated intellectual manner.

Notes

1895 births
1985 deaths
Writers from Iași
Romanian people of Armenian descent
Alexandru Ioan Cuza University alumni
Academic staff of the University of Bucharest
20th-century Romanian judges
Romanian political scientists
Romanian economists
Romanian essayists
Romanian magazine editors
Romanian film critics
Romanian columnists
Romanian translators
Romanian censors
Film theorists
20th-century translators
20th-century essayists
20th-century Romanian civil servants
20th-century Romanian writers
Film people from Iași
Academic staff of Carol I National Defence University
Academic staff of the Bucharest National University of Arts
20th-century political scientists